Joe Weingarten (born 17 March 1962, in Bad Kreuznach) is a German Social Democratic Party of Germany politician and has been a member of the Bundestag since 1 November 2019. In parliament, he serves on the Defense committee as well as on the Subcommittee on Disarmament, Arms Control and Non-Proliferation.

Other activities A
 Federal Academy for Security Policy (BAKS), Member of the Advisory Board (since 2022)

References

Members of the Bundestag 2017–2021
Members of the Bundestag 2021–2025
Members of the Bundestag for Rhineland-Palatinate
People from Bad Kreuznach
1962 births
Living people
Members of the Bundestag for the Social Democratic Party of Germany
Recipients of the Medal of the Order of Merit of the Federal Republic of Germany